Dow Baraleh (also Romanized as Dow Barāleh, Dubarālah, Dūberāleh, and Do Barāleh; also known as Dobrāla) is a village in Chaharduli Rural District, in the Central District of Asadabad County, Hamadan Province, Iran. At the 2006 census, its population was 288, in 61 families.

References 

Populated places in Asadabad County